Glipostenoda chibi is a species of beetle in the genus Glipostenoda. It was described in 1932.

References

chibi
Beetles described in 1932
Taxa named by Hiromichi Kono